PatternShare was a computer software design pattern web resource, hosted by Microsoft. Much of the work was led by Ward Cunningham, of Microsoft. In 2007 Pattern Share was taken offline. 

Its aim appeared to be to: bring together pattern summaries from many authors and provide a platform for discussion and further exploration of the interconnections between them.

In 2007 Patternshare.org was taken offline. Reports indicate that the Patterns & Practices team at Microsoft felt that time was better spent integrating P&P principles into re-usable code libraries, as opposed to devoting resources to direct developer education.

References

External links
Microsoft Patterns and Practices Developer Center
 Archive.org - Last known mirror entry Dec. 05 2006 

Software design patterns